Ông Trời (literally meaning "Old Man Sky/Heaven") is commonly referred to just as Trời ("sky, heaven"). Ông Trời is one of the most important gods in traditional Vietnamese folk religion. Later, due to the influence of Taoism, he was identified with the Jade Emperor, so he was often called the Ngọc Hoàng Thượng Đế, often referred to as Ngọc Hoàng or Thượng Đế.

Names 
Ông Trời is referred to by many names depending on the religious circumstances such as,

In South Vietnam, he is often called Ông Thiên (翁天)

In Đạo Mẫu, he is called the Vua Cha Ngọc Hoàng (𢂜吒玉皇, Monarchial Father Ngọc Hoàng).

In Vietnamese Buddhism, he is frequently identified with Śakra (Đế Thích Thiên; 帝釋天).

In Vietnamese mythology and folk religion, he is referred to as Hạo Thiên Đế (昊天帝) which is a shortening of the name, Hạo Thiên Ngọc Hoàng Thượng đế (昊天玉皇上帝). These names are derived from the names used to refer to the Jade Emperor, such as Ngọc Hoàng Thượng Đế (玉皇上帝), shorten as Ngọc Hoàng (玉皇), Thượng đế (上帝), or Ngọc Đế (玉帝). An alternative name for the Jade Emperor would be Ngọc Hoàng Đại Đế (玉皇大帝).

Mythology
Ông Trời was originally a Vietnamese god, but due to later influence by Taoism from China, this god was identified and linked with the Jade Emperor (Ngọc Hoàng).

Origin
The origin of this god is not agreed upon, according to one of the most popular stories recounted that:

Some other versions say that the god, Thần Trụ Trời and Ông Trời are one.

Worship
He is worshiped all over Vietnam, there are many temples and shrines dedicated to him. In South and Central Vietnam, families often worship him at an outdoor altar called Bàn Thiên.

In popular culture
Television program
 Gặp nhau cuối năm
An interjection used in Vietnamese "Trời ơi!" (hey heavenly (lord)) is often translated into English as "for goodness' sake!" or "dear God!" or "what the heck!".

Gallery

See also
 Vietnamese folk religion
 Vietnamese mythology  
 Đạo Mẫu
Counterparts of Ông Trời in other cultures
 Jade Emperor, the Chinese counterpart
 Amenominakanushi, the Japanese counterpart
 Haneullim, the Korean counterpart

References

Vietnamese gods
Vietnamese deities
Vietnamese mythology